Carotenoids, also called tetraterpenoids, are yellow, orange, and red organic pigments that are produced by plants and algae, as well as several bacteria, and fungi. Carotenoids give the characteristic color to pumpkins, carrots, parsnips, corn, tomatoes, canaries, flamingos, salmon, lobster, shrimp, and daffodils. Carotenoids can be produced from fats and other basic organic metabolic building blocks by all these organisms.  It is also produced by endosymbiotic bacteria in whiteflies. Carotenoids from the diet are stored in the fatty tissues of animals, and exclusively carnivorous animals obtain the compounds from animal fat. In the human diet, absorption of carotenoids is improved when consumed with fat in a meal. Cooking carotenoid-containing vegetables in oil and shredding the vegetable both increase carotenoid bioavailability.

There are over 1,100 known carotenoids which can be further categorized into two classes, xanthophylls (which contain oxygen) and carotenes (which are purely hydrocarbons and contain no oxygen). All are derivatives of tetraterpenes, meaning that they are produced from 8 isoprene molecules and contain 40 carbon atoms. In general, carotenoids absorb wavelengths ranging from 400 to 550 nanometers (violet to green light). This causes the compounds to be deeply colored yellow, orange, or red. Carotenoids are the dominant pigment in autumn leaf coloration of about 15-30% of tree species, but many plant colors, especially reds and purples, are due to polyphenols.

Carotenoids serve two key roles in plants and algae: they absorb light energy for use in photosynthesis, and they provide photoprotection via non-photochemical quenching. Carotenoids that contain unsubstituted beta-ionone rings  (including β-carotene, α-carotene, β-cryptoxanthin, and γ-carotene) have vitamin A activity (meaning that they can be converted to retinol). In the eye, lutein, meso-zeaxanthin, and zeaxanthin are present as macular pigments whose importance in visual function, as of 2016, remains under clinical research.

Biosynthesis 

The basic building blocks of carotenoids are isopentenyl diphosphate (IPP) and dimethylallyl diphosphate (DMAPP). These two isoprene isomers are used to create various compounds depending on the biological pathway used to synthesize the isomers. Plants are known to use two different pathways for IPP production: the cytosolic mevalonic acid pathway (MVA) and the plastidic methylerythritol 4-phosphate (MEP). In animals, the production of cholesterol starts by creating IPP and DMAPP using the MVA. For carotenoid production plants use MEP to generate IPP and DMAPP. The MEP pathway results in a 5:1 mixture of IPP:DMAPP. IPP and DMAPP undergo several reactions, resulting in the major carotenoid precursor, geranylgeranyl diphosphate (GGPP). GGPP can be converted into carotenes or xanthophylls by undergoing a number of different steps within the carotenoid biosynthetic pathway.

MEP pathway 
Glyceraldehyde 3-phosphate and pyruvate, intermediates of photosynthesis, are converted to deoxy-D-xylulose 5-phosphate (DXP) using the catalyst DXP synthase (DXS). DXP reductoisomerase reduces and rearranges the molecules within DXP in the presence of NADPH, forming MEP. Next, MEP is converted to 4-(cytidine 5’-diphospho)-2-C-methyl-D-erythritol (CDP-ME) in the presence of CTP via the enzyme MEP cytidylyltransferase. CDP-ME is then converted, in the presence of ATP, to 2-phospho-4-(cytidine 5’-diphospho)-2-C-methyl-D-erythritol (CDP-ME2P). The conversion to CDP-ME2P is catalyzed by the enzyme CDP-ME kinase. Next, CDP-ME2P is converted to 2-C-methyl-D-erythritol 2,4-cyclodiphosphate (MECDP). This reaction occurs when MECDP synthase catalyzes the reaction and CMP is eliminated from the CDP-ME2P molecule. MECDP is then converted to (e)-4-hydroxy-3-methylbut-2-en-1-yl diphosphate (HMBDP) via HMBDP synthase in the presence of flavodoxin and NADPH. HMBDP is reduced to IPP in the presence of ferredoxin and NADPH by the enzyme HMBDP reductase. The last two steps involving HMBPD synthase and reductase can only occur in completely anaerobic environments. IPP is then able to isomerize to DMAPP via IPP isomerase.

Carotenoid biosynthetic pathway 

Two GGPP molecules condense via phytoene synthase (PSY), forming the 15-cis isomer of phytoene. PSY belongs to the squalene/phytoene synthase family and is homologous to squalene synthase that takes part in steroid biosynthesis. The subsequent conversion of phytoene into all-trans-lycopene depends on the organism. Bacteria and fungi employ a single enzyme, the bacterial phytoene desaturase (CRTI) for the catalysis. Plants and cyanobacteria however utilize four enzymes for this process. The first of these enzymes is a plant-type phytoene desaturase which introduces two additional double bonds into 15-cis-phytoene by  dehydrogenation and isomerizes two of its existing double bonds from trans to cis producing 9,15,9’-tri-cis-ζ-carotene. The central double bond of this tri-cis-ζ-carotene is isomerized by the zeta-carotene isomerase Z-ISO and the resulting 9,9'-di-cis-ζ-carotene is dehydrogenated again via a ζ-carotene desaturase (ZDS). This again introduces two double bonds, resulting in 7,9,7’,9’-tetra-cis-lycopene. CRTISO, a carotenoid isomerase, is needed to convert the cis-lycopene into an all-trans lycopene in the presence of reduced FAD.

This all-trans lycopene is cyclized; cyclization gives rise to carotenoid diversity, which can be distinguished based on the end groups. There can be either a beta ring or an epsilon ring, each generated by a different enzyme (lycopene beta-cyclase  [beta-LCY] or lycopene epsilon-cyclase [epsilon-LCY]). α-Carotene is produced when the all-trans lycopene first undergoes reaction with epsilon-LCY then a second reaction with beta-LCY; whereas β-carotene is produced by two reactions with beta-LCY. α- and β-Carotene are the most common carotenoids in the plant photosystems but they can still be further converted into xanthophylls by using beta-hydrolase and epsilon-hydrolase, leading to a variety of xanthophylls.

Regulation 
It is believed that both DXS and DXR are rate-determining enzymes, allowing them to regulate carotenoid levels. This was discovered in an experiment where DXS and DXR were genetically overexpressed, leading to increased carotenoid expression in the resulting seedlings. Also, J-protein (J20) and heat shock protein 70 (Hsp70) chaperones are thought to be involved in post-transcriptional regulation of DXS activity, such that mutants with defective J20 activity exhibit reduced DXS enzyme activity while accumulating inactive DXS protein. Regulation may also be caused by external toxins that affect enzymes and proteins required for synthesis. Ketoclomazone is derived from herbicides applied to soil and binds to DXP synthase. This inhibits DXP synthase, preventing synthesis of DXP and halting the MEP pathway. The use of this toxin leads to lower levels of carotenoids in plants grown in the contaminated soil. Fosmidomycin, an antibiotic, is a competitive inhibitor of DXP reductoisomerase due to its similar structure to the enzyme. Application of said antibiotic prevents reduction of DXP, again halting the MEP pathway.

Structure and function 

The structure of carotenoids allows for biological abilities, including photosynthesis, photoprotection, plant coloration, and cell signaling.  

The general structure of the carotenoid is a polyene chain consisting of 9-11 double bonds and possibly terminating in rings. This structure of conjugated double bonds leads to a high reducing potential, or the ability to transfer electrons throughout the molecule. Carotenoids can transfer excitation energy in one of two ways: 1) singlet-singlet energy transfer from carotenoid to chlorophyll, and 2) triplet-triplet energy transfer from chlorophyll to carotenoid. The singlet-singlet energy transfer is a lower energy state transfer and is used during photosynthesis. The length of the polyene tail enables light absorbance in the photosynthetic range; once it absorbs energy it becomes excited, then transfers the excited electrons to the chlorophyll for photosynthesis. The triplet-triplet transfer is a higher energy state and is essential in photoprotection. Light produces damaging species during photosynthesis, with the most damaging being reactive oxygen species (ROS). As these high energy ROS are produced in the chlorophyll the energy is transferred to the carotenoid’s polyene tail and undergoes a series of reactions in which electrons are moved between the carotenoid bonds in order to find the most balanced (lowest energy) state for the carotenoid.

The length of carotenoids also has a role in plant coloration, as the length of the polyene tail determines which wavelengths of light the plant will absorb. Wavelengths that are not absorbed are reflected and are what we see as the color of a plant. Therefore, differing species will contain carotenoids with differing tail lengths allowing them to absorb and reflect different colors.

Carotenoids also participate in different types of cell signaling. They are able to signal the production of abscisic acid, which regulates plant growth, seed dormancy, embryo maturation and germination, cell division and elongation, floral growth, and stress responses.

Properties 

Carotenoids belong to the category of tetraterpenoids (i.e., they contain 40 carbon atoms, being built from four terpene units each containing 10 carbon atoms). Structurally, carotenoids take the form of a polyene hydrocarbon chain which is sometimes terminated by rings, and may or may not have additional oxygen atoms attached.
 Carotenoids with molecules containing oxygen, such as lutein and zeaxanthin, are known as xanthophylls.
 The unoxygenated (oxygen free) carotenoids such as α-carotene, β-carotene, and lycopene, are known as carotenes. Carotenes typically contain only carbon and hydrogen (i.e., are hydrocarbons), and are in the subclass of unsaturated hydrocarbons.

Their color, ranging from pale yellow through bright orange to deep red, is directly linked to their structure. Xanthophylls are often yellow, hence their class name. The double carbon-carbon bonds interact with each other in a process called conjugation, which allows electrons in the molecule to move freely across these areas of the molecule. As the number of conjugated double bonds increases, electrons associated with conjugated systems have more room to move, and require less energy to change states. This causes the range of energies of light absorbed by the molecule to decrease. As more wavelengths of light are absorbed from the longer end of the visible spectrum, the compounds acquire an increasingly red appearance.

Carotenoids are usually lipophilic due to the presence of long unsaturated aliphatic chains as in some fatty acids. The physiological absorption of these fat-soluble vitamins in humans and other organisms depends directly on the presence of fats and bile salts.

Foods
Beta-carotene, found in pumpkins, sweet potato, carrots and winter squash, is responsible for their orange-yellow colors. Dried carrots have the highest amount of carotene of any food per 100-gram serving, measured in retinol activity equivalents (provitamin A equivalents). Vietnamese gac fruit contains the highest known concentration of the carotenoid lycopene. Although green, kale, spinach, collard greens, and turnip greens contain substantial amounts of beta-carotene. The diet of flamingos is rich in carotenoids, imparting the orange-colored feathers of these birds.

Morphology 
Carotenoids are located primarily outside the cell nucleus in different cytoplasm organelles, lipid droplets, cytosomes and granules. They have been visualised and quantified by raman spectroscopy in an algal cell.

With the development of monoclonal antibodies to trans-lycopene it was possible to localise this carotenoid in different animal and human cells.

Oxygenation 
Carotenoids play an important role in biological oxygenation. In plant cells they are involved in the control of trans-membrane transport of molecular oxygen released in photosynthesis.

In animals carotenoids play an important role to support oxygen in its transport, storage and metabolism.

Transport 
Carotenoids are hydrophobic and are typically present in plasma lipoproteins and cellular lipid structures. Since molecular oxygen is also a hydrophobic molecule, lipids provide a more favorable environment for O2 solubility than in aqueous mediums. By protecting lipids from free-radical damage, which generate charged lipid peroxides and other oxidised derivatives, carotenoids support crystalline architecture and hydrophobicity of lipoproteins and cellular lipid structures, hence oxygen solubility and its diffusion therein.

Storage 
It was first suggested that carotenoids can be involved in the intracellular depot of oxygen in 1973 by V.N. Karnaukhov. Later it was discovered that carotenoids can also stimulate the formation of intracellular lipid droplets, which can store additional molecular oxygen. These properties of carotenoids help animals to adapt to environmental stresses, high altitude, intracellular infections and other hypoxic conditions.

Respiration 
Carotenoids, by increasing oxygen diffusion and the oxygen carrying capacity of plasma lipoproteins, can stimulate oxygen delivery into body tissues. This improves tissue and cellular oxygenation and stimulates the growth and respiration of mitochondria.

Synergetic modality 
Oxygen is required in many intracellular reactions including hydroxylation, which is important for metabolic activation of prodrugs and prohormones, such as vitamin D3. Carotenoids not only provide support for intracellular oxygenation but can also improve efficacy of these molecules.

Carotenoids can form physical complexes with different molecules. With hydrophobic molecules this could be self-assembly. With amphiphilic or hydrophilic compounds the use of lycosome or supercritical CO2 technologies, or other methods, are required.] Carotenoids in these complexes provide a new modality of supporting and boosting tissue oxygenation, which could be synergistically beneficial to the therapeutic objectives of different nutraceutical or pharmaceutical molecules.

Physiological effects
Reviews of epidemiological studies seeking correlations between carotenoid consumption in food and clinical outcomes have come to various conclusions:
 A 2015 review found that foods high in carotenoids appear to be protective against head and neck cancers.
 Another 2015 review looking at whether carotenoids can prevent prostate cancer found that while several studies found correlations between diets rich in carotenoids appeared to have a protective effect, evidence is lacking to determine whether this is due to carotenoids per se.
 A 2014 review found no correlation between consumption of foods high in carotenoids and vitamin A and the risk of getting Parkinson's disease.
 Another 2014 review found no conflicting results in studies of dietary consumption of carotenoids and the risk of getting breast cancer.

Carotenoids are also important components of the dark brown pigment melanin, which is found in hair, skin, and eyes. Melanin absorbs high-energy light and protects these organs from intracellular damage.
 Several studies have observed positive effects of high-carotenoid diets on the texture, clarity, color, strength, and elasticity of skin.
 A 1994 study noted that high carotenoid diets helped reduce symptoms of eyestrain (dry eye, headaches, and blurred vision) and improve night vision.

Humans and other animals are mostly incapable of synthesizing carotenoids, and must obtain them through their diet. Carotenoids are a common and often ornamental feature in animals. For example, the pink color of salmon, and the red coloring of cooked lobsters and scales of the yellow morph of common wall lizards are due to carotenoids. It has been proposed that carotenoids are used in ornamental traits (for extreme examples see puffin birds) because, given their physiological and chemical properties, they can be used as visible indicators of individual health, and hence are used by animals when selecting potential mates.

Plant colors 

The most common carotenoids include lycopene and the vitamin A precursor β-carotene. In plants, the xanthophyll lutein is the most abundant carotenoid and its role in preventing age-related eye disease is currently under investigation. Lutein and the other carotenoid pigments found in mature leaves are often not obvious because of the masking presence of chlorophyll. When chlorophyll is not present, as in autumn foliage, the yellows and oranges of the carotenoids are predominant. For the same reason, carotenoid colors often predominate in ripe fruit after being unmasked by the disappearance of chlorophyll.

Carotenoids are responsible for the brilliant yellows and oranges that tint deciduous foliage (such as dying autumn leaves) of certain hardwood species as hickories, ash, maple, yellow poplar, aspen, birch, black cherry, sycamore, cottonwood, sassafras, and alder. Carotenoids are the dominant pigment in autumn leaf coloration of about 15-30% of tree species. However, the reds, the purples, and their blended combinations that decorate autumn foliage usually come from another group of pigments in the cells called anthocyanins. Unlike the carotenoids, these pigments are not present in the leaf throughout the growing season, but are actively produced towards the end of summer.

Bird colors and sexual selection 
Dietary carotenoids and their metabolic derivatives are responsible for bright yellow to red coloration in birds. Studies estimate that around 2956 modern bird species display carotenoid coloration and that the ability to utilize these pigments for external coloration has evolved independently many times throughout avian evolutionary history. Carotenoid coloration exhibits high levels of sexual dimorphism, with adult male birds generally displaying more vibrant coloration than females of the same species.

These differences arise due to the selection of yellow and red coloration in males by female preference. In many species of birds, females invest greater time and resources into raising offspring than their male partners. Therefore, it is imperative that female birds carefully select high quality mates. Current literature supports the theory that vibrant carotenoid coloration is correlated with male quality—either though direct effects on immune function and oxidative stress, or through a connection between carotenoid metabolizing pathways and pathways for cellular respiration.

Sexual signaling

It is generally considered that sexually selected traits, such as carotenoid-based coloration, evolve because they are honest signals of phenotypic and genetic quality.  For instance, among males of the bird species Parus major, the more colorfully ornamented males produce sperm that is better protected against oxidative stress due to increased presence of carotenoid antioxidants.  However, there is also evidence that attractive male coloration may be a faulty signal of male quality.  Among stickleback fish, males that are more attractive to females due to carotenoid colorants appear to under-allocate carotenoids to their germline cells.   Since carotinoids are beneficial antioxidants, their under-allocation to germline cells can lead to increased oxidative DNA damage to these cells.  Therefore, female sticklebacks may risk fertility and the viability of their offspring by choosing redder, but more deteriorated partners with reduced sperm quality.

Aroma chemicals
Products of carotenoid degradation such as ionones, damascones and damascenones are also important fragrance chemicals that are used extensively in the perfumes and fragrance industry. Both β-damascenone and β-ionone although low in concentration in rose distillates are the key odor-contributing compounds in flowers. In fact, the sweet floral smells present in black tea, aged tobacco, grape, and many fruits are due to the aromatic compounds resulting from carotenoid breakdown.

Disease
Some carotenoids are produced by bacteria to protect themselves from oxidative immune attack. The aureus (golden) pigment that gives some strains of Staphylococcus aureus their name is a carotenoid called staphyloxanthin. This carotenoid is a virulence factor with an antioxidant action that helps the microbe evade death by reactive oxygen species used by the host immune system.

Naturally occurring carotenoids
 Hydrocarbons
 Lycopersene 7,8,11,12,15,7',8',11',12',15'-Decahydro-γ,γ-carotene
 Phytofluene
 Lycopene
 Hexahydrolycopene 15-cis-7,8,11,12,7',8'-Hexahydro-γ,γ-carotene
 Torulene 3',4'-Didehydro-β,γ-carotene
 α-Zeacarotene 7',8'-Dihydro-ε,γ-carotene
 α-Carotene
 β-Carotene
 γ-Carotene
 δ-Carotene
 ε-Carotene
 ζ-Carotene
 Alcohols
 Alloxanthin
 Bacterioruberin 2,2'-Bis(3-hydroxy-3-methylbutyl)-3,4,3',4'-tetradehydro-1,2,1',2'-tetrahydro-γ,γ-carotene-1,1'-diol
 Cynthiaxanthin
 Pectenoxanthin
 Cryptomonaxanthin (3R,3'R)-7,8,7',8'-Tetradehydro-β,β-carotene-3,3'-diol
 Crustaxanthin β,-Carotene-3,4,3',4'-tetrol
 Gazaniaxanthin (3R)-5'-cis-β,γ-Caroten-3-ol
 OH-Chlorobactene 1',2'-Dihydro-f,γ-caroten-1'-ol
 Loroxanthin β,ε-Carotene-3,19,3'-triol
 Lutein (3R,3′R,6′R)-β,ε-carotene-3,3′-diol
 Lycoxanthin γ,γ-Caroten-16-ol
 Rhodopin 1,2-Dihydro-γ,γ-caroten-l-ol
 Rhodopinol a.k.a. Warmingol  13-cis-1,2-Dihydro-γ,γ-carotene-1,20-diol
 Saproxanthin 3',4'-Didehydro-1',2'-dihydro-β,γ-carotene-3,1'-diol
 Zeaxanthin
 Glycosides
 Oscillaxanthin 2,2'-Bis(β-L-rhamnopyranosyloxy)-3,4,3',4'-tetradehydro-1,2,1',2'-tetrahydro-γ,γ-carotene-1,1'-diol
 Phleixanthophyll 1'-(β-D-Glucopyranosyloxy)-3',4'-didehydro-1',2'-dihydro-β,γ-caroten-2'-ol
 Ethers
 Rhodovibrin 1'-Methoxy-3',4'-didehydro-1,2,1',2'-tetrahydro-γ,γ-caroten-1-ol
 Spheroidene 1-Methoxy-3,4-didehydro-1,2,7',8'-tetrahydro-γ,γ-carotene
 Epoxides
 Diadinoxanthin 5,6-Epoxy-7',8'-didehydro-5,6-dihydro—carotene-3,3-diol
 Luteoxanthin 5,6: 5',8'-Diepoxy-5,6,5',8'-tetrahydro-β,β-carotene-3,3'-diol
 Mutatoxanthin
 Citroxanthin
 Zeaxanthin furanoxide 5,8-Epoxy-5,8-dihydro-β,β-carotene-3,3'-diol
 Neochrome         5',8'-Epoxy-6,7-didehydro-5,6,5',8'-tetrahydro-β,β-carotene-3,5,3'-triol
 Foliachrome
 Trollichrome
 Vaucheriaxanthin 5',6'-Epoxy-6,7-didehydro-5,6,5',6'-tetrahydro-β,β-carotene-3,5,19,3'-tetrol
 Aldehydes
 Rhodopinal
 Warmingone 13-cis-1-Hydroxy-1,2-dihydro-γ,γ-caroten-20-al
 Torularhodinaldehyde 3',4'-Didehydro-β,γ-caroten-16'-al
 Acids and acid esters
 Torularhodin 3',4'-Didehydro-β,γ-caroten-16'-oic acid
 Torularhodin methyl ester Methyl 3',4'-didehydro-β,γ-caroten-16'-oate
 Ketones
 Astacene
 Astaxanthin
 Canthaxanthin a.k.a. Aphanicin, Chlorellaxanthin β,β-Carotene-4,4'-dione
 Capsanthin (3R,3'S,5'R)-3,3'-Dihydroxy-β,κ-caroten-6'-one
 Capsorubin (3S,5R,3'S,5'R)-3,3'-Dihydroxy-κ,κ-carotene-6,6'-dione
 Cryptocapsin (3'R,5'R)-3'-Hydroxy-β,κ-caroten-6'-one
 2,2'-Diketospirilloxanthin 1,1'-Dimethoxy-3,4,3',4'-tetradehydro-1,2,1',2'-tetrahydro-γ,γ-carotene-2,2'-dione
 Echinenone β,β-Caroten-4-one
 3'-Hydroxyechinenone
 Flexixanthin 3,1'-Dihydroxy-3',4'-didehydro-1',2'-dihydro-β,γ-caroten-4-one
 3-OH-Canthaxanthin a.k.a. Adonirubin a.k.a. Phoenicoxanthin 3-Hydroxy-β,β-carotene-4,4'-dione
 Hydroxyspheriodenone 1'-Hydroxy-1-methoxy-3,4-didehydro-1,2,1',2',7',8'-hexahydro-γ,γ-caroten-2-one
 Okenone 1'-Methoxy-1',2'-dihydro-c,γ-caroten-4'-one
 Pectenolone 3,3'-Dihydroxy-7',8'-didehydro-β,β-caroten-4-one
 Phoeniconone a.k.a. Dehydroadonirubin 3-Hydroxy-2,3-didehydro-β,β-carotene-4,4'-dione
 Phoenicopterone β,ε-caroten-4-one
 Rubixanthone 3-Hydroxy-β,γ-caroten-4'-one
 Siphonaxanthin 3,19,3'-Trihydroxy-7,8-dihydro-β,ε-caroten-8-one
 Esters of alcohols
 Astacein 3,3'-Bispalmitoyloxy-2,3,2',3'-tetradehydro-β,β-carotene-4,4'-dione or 3,3'-dihydroxy-2,3,2',3'-tetradehydro-β,β-carotene-4,4'-dione dipalmitate
 Fucoxanthin 3'-Acetoxy-5,6-epoxy-3,5'-dihydroxy-6',7'-didehydro-5,6,7,8,5',6'-hexahydro-β,β-caroten-8-one
 Isofucoxanthin 3'-Acetoxy-3,5,5'-trihydroxy-6',7'-didehydro-5,8,5',6'-tetrahydro-β,β-caroten-8-one
 Physalien
 Siphonein 3,3'-Dihydroxy-19-lauroyloxy-7,8-dihydro-β,ε-caroten-8-one or 3,19,3'-trihydroxy-7,8-dihydro-β,ε-caroten-8-one 19-laurate
 Apocarotenoids
 β-Apo-2'-carotenal 3',4'-Didehydro-2'-apo-b-caroten-2'-al
 Apo-2-lycopenal
 Apo-6'-lycopenal 6'-Apo-y-caroten-6'-al
 Azafrinaldehyde 5,6-Dihydroxy-5,6-dihydro-10'-apo-β-caroten-10'-al
 Bixin 6'-Methyl hydrogen 9'-cis-6,6'-diapocarotene-6,6'-dioate
 Citranaxanthin 5',6'-Dihydro-5'-apo-β-caroten-6'-one or 5',6'-dihydro-5'-apo-18'-nor-β-caroten-6'-one or 6'-methyl-6'-apo-β-caroten-6'-one
 Crocetin 8,8'-Diapo-8,8'-carotenedioic acid
 Crocetinsemialdehyde 8'-Oxo-8,8'-diapo-8-carotenoic acid
 Crocin Digentiobiosyl 8,8'-diapo-8,8'-carotenedioate
 Hopkinsiaxanthin 3-Hydroxy-7,8-didehydro-7',8'-dihydro-7'-apo-b-carotene-4,8'-dione or 3-hydroxy-8'-methyl-7,8-didehydro-8'-apo-b-carotene-4,8'-dione
 Methyl apo-6'-lycopenoate Methyl 6'-apo-y-caroten-6'-oate
 Paracentrone 3,5-Dihydroxy-6,7-didehydro-5,6,7',8'-tetrahydro-7'-apo-b-caroten-8'-one or 3,5-dihydroxy-8'-methyl-6,7-didehydro-5,6-dihydro-8'-apo-b-caroten-8'-one
 Sintaxanthin 7',8'-Dihydro-7'-apo-b-caroten-8'-one or 8'-methyl-8'-apo-b-caroten-8'-one
 Nor- and seco-carotenoids
 Actinioerythrin 3,3'-Bisacyloxy-2,2'-dinor-b,b-carotene-4,4'-dione
 β-Carotenone 5,6:5',6'-Diseco-b,b-carotene-5,6,5',6'-tetrone
 Peridinin 3'-Acetoxy-5,6-epoxy-3,5'-dihydroxy-6',7'-didehydro-5,6,5',6'-tetrahydro-12',13',20'-trinor-b,b-caroten-19,11-olide
 Pyrrhoxanthininol 5,6-epoxy-3,3'-dihydroxy-7',8'-didehydro-5,6-dihydro-12',13',20'-trinor-b,b-caroten-19,11-olide
 Semi-α-carotenone 5,6-Seco-b,e-carotene-5,6-dione
 Semi-β-carotenone 5,6-seco-b,b-carotene-5,6-dione or 5',6'-seco-b,b-carotene-5',6'-dione
 Triphasiaxanthin 3-Hydroxysemi-b-carotenone 3'-Hydroxy-5,6-seco-b,b-carotene-5,6-dione or 3-hydroxy-5',6'-seco-b,b-carotene-5',6'-dione
 Retro-carotenoids and retro-apo-carotenoids
 Eschscholtzxanthin 4',5'-Didehydro-4,5'-retro-b,b-carotene-3,3'-diol
 Eschscholtzxanthone 3'-Hydroxy-4',5'-didehydro-4,5'-retro-b,b-caroten-3-one
 Rhodoxanthin 4',5'-Didehydro-4,5'-retro-b,b-carotene-3,3'-dione
 Tangeraxanthin 3-Hydroxy-5'-methyl-4,5'-retro-5'-apo-b-caroten-5'-one or 3-hydroxy-4,5'-retro-5'-apo-b-caroten-5'-one
 Higher carotenoids
 Nonaprenoxanthin 2-(4-Hydroxy-3-methyl-2-butenyl)-7',8',11',12'-tetrahydro-e,y-carotene
 Decaprenoxanthin 2,2'-Bis(4-hydroxy-3-methyl-2-butenyl)-e,e-carotene
 C.p. 450 2-[4-Hydroxy-3-(hydroxymethyl)-2-butenyl]-2'-(3-methyl-2-butenyl)-b,b-carotene
 C.p. 473 2'-(4-Hydroxy-3-methyl-2-butenyl)-2-(3-methyl-2-butenyl)-3',4'-didehydro-l',2'-dihydro-β,γ-caroten-1'-ol
 Bacterioruberin 2,2'-Bis(3-hydroxy-3-methylbutyl)-3,4,3',4'-tetradehydro-1,2,1',2'-tetrahydro-γ,γ-carotene-1,1'-diol

See also
 List of phytochemicals in food
 CRT (genetics), gene cluster responsible for the biosynthesis of carotenoids
 E number#E100–E199 (colours)
 Phytochemistry

References

External links

 Carotenoid Terpenoids
 Carotenoids as Flavor and Fragrance Precursors
 Carotenoid gene in aphids
 International Carotenoid Society
 

Bioindicators
 
Photosynthesis